Basket SKT Ieper is a basketball team based in Ypres (Ieper), Belgium. For a long time, it was known as Athlon Ieper and played in the First Division. From 2008 the team name was Melco Ieper. In 2020 they had a fusion with the female basketball club Blue Cats. Together, their new name is Basket SKT Ieper.

In the 2000–01 season, Ieper reached the semi-finals of the Korać Cup.FIBA Europe.com After that season, Athlon pulled out of the professional First Division and started playing in amateur leagues.

Notable players
 Moussa Ouattara (1 season: 2014–15)
 Roger Huggins (1 season: 2000–01)
 J. R. Koch (1 season: 1999–2000)

References

Basketball teams in Belgium